Hannah Consencino Arnold (born January 21, 1996) is a Filipino model and beauty pageant titleholder who was crowned Binibining Pilipinas International 2021. She represented the Philippines at the Miss International 2022 pageant and finished in the top 15.

Early life and education
Hannah Consencino Arnold was born in Balud, Masbate, Philippines. Her father is of Irish-Australian descent and her Filipino mother is from Masbate, Bicol Region. Arnold was raised in Canberra, Australia before returning to the Philippines after graduating from the University of Canberra with a degree in Applied Science in Forensic Studies.

Pageantry

Baby Queen of Masbate 2002
Arnold's first pageant was in 2002, when she won Baby Queen of Masbate at the age of six.

Miss Philippines Australia 2014
In 2014, Arnold was crowned Miss Philippines Australia - Charity Queen at 18 years old.  This also began her charitable activities which she continues to perform to this day. Arnold is a consistent donor to the White Cross Orphanage for the past 4 to 5 years, donating funds and goods annually on her birthday.

Binibining Pilipinas 2019
In 2019, Arnold joined the Binibining Pilipinas 2019 competition. During the question and answer round, she was asked: "What is your message for the young and new breed of politicians that won in the recent elections, for example, Pasig Mayor Vico Sotto?" She responded:
"Well, I would like to say that I'm so proud to be a millennial right now. The youth are building our nation. We're on the road to a better nation, a better world, and it's thanks to these politicians. So, thank you."

At the end of the event, she finished as a top 15 finalist.

Binibining Pilipinas 2021
In 2021, Arnold joined the Binibining Pilipinas 2021 competition. During the question and answer round, Arnold was asked: "Given the reach and power of social media, do you believe that genuine freedom of speech exists in the Philippines nowadays? Why or why not?" She responded:

"First of all, freedom of speech is a basic human right that we all must remember. It is important for our democracy. With our upcoming election, we definitely need freedom of speech. For example, on Twitter, we are limited to a few characters, and what I have seen in these Tweets is powerful. That has helped me think about who I'd like to vote for in the upcoming elections. Thank you."

At the end of the event, she was crowned Binibining Pilipinas International 2021, succeeding Bea Patricia Magtanong. She also bagged the Jag Denim Queen and Miss Careline awards.

Miss International 2022
As the winner of Binibining Pilipinas International 2021, Arnold represented the Philippines at the Miss International 2022 pageant and finished in the Top 15. Her journey in Miss International 2022 as a Top 15 semifinalist marks the 100th placement of the Philippines in the Big Four international beauty pageants.

References

External links
Binibining Pilipinas Official Website

1996 births
Living people
Binibining Pilipinas winners
Filipino female models
Filipino people of Australian descent
Filipino people of Irish descent
People from Masbate
People from Canberra
Australian female models
Australian people of Filipino descent
Australian people of Irish descent
Bicolano people
Miss International 2021 delegates